Madhwan Gounder is a soccer player who played for Rewa F.C. in the 2017 Fiji National Football League.

References

Living people
Fijian footballers
Fiji international footballers
Rewa F.C. players
Fijian people of Indian descent
Year of birth missing (living people)
Association footballers not categorized by position